Route 310, also known as Road to the Beaches, in Newfoundland and Labrador runs from its southern terminus at Glovertown, and ends at its northern terminus at the community of Salvage, all along the Eastport Peninsula of Newfoundland.  A portion of this route runs through Terra Nova National Park.  The route is noteworthy for its beautiful sandy beaches, particularly in the towns of Eastport and Sandy Cove.  The speed limit ranges from 60–70 km/h except when traveling through  a community in which the speed is reduced to 50 km/h (30 km/h in Salvage).

Route 310 can also be accessed via an east access at Route 1 through Terra Nova National Park, though Route 310 officially starts in the town of Glovertown (at Exit 25).

Route description

Route 310 begins in Glovertown at an interchange with Route 1 (Trans-Canada Highway, Exit 25). It heads east to pass through downtown and the harbour before crossing over a river into Traytown. The highway passes through town along Main Street, where it meets a local road leading to Cull's Harbour, local road into Terra Nova National Park, as well as meeting the East Access to Route 1. Route 310 now leaves Traytown and crosses a long Causeway to pass through Sandringham and Eastport, where the highway meets local roads leading to Happy Adventure, Sandy Cove, St. Chad's, Clay Cove, and Burnside. At Burnside, a ferry port services St. Brendan's. Route 310 now winds its way northeast up the coastline for several kilometres to enter Salvage, where it comes to a dead end.

Major intersections

References

External links
 Town of Glovertown website
 Town of Eastport website
 Town of Sandy Cove website

310